KGX can mean:

 The SIL code for the Kamaru language of Sulawesi
 FAA identifier for the Grayling Airport of Grayling, Alaska
 The station code for London King's Cross railway station
 The name for Palm Springs radio station  KKGX